During the 1939–40 Scottish football season, Celtic competed in the Scottish First Division.

Results

Scottish First Division

Western Division

War Emergency Cup

References

Celtic F.C. seasons
Celtic